The Flat Earth is the second album by English new wave/synth-pop musician Thomas Dolby, released in 1984.

A remastered "Collector's Edition" of The Flat Earth was released on 13 July 2009, featuring bonus tracks and new sleeve notes.

Reception
The Flat Earth peaked at No. 14 on the UK Albums Chart. The first single from the album was "Hyperactive!", which peaked at No. 17 in the UK Singles Chart, making it Dolby's highest-charting single in his home country. Second and third singles, "I Scare Myself" and "Dissidents", peaked at Nos. 46 and 90, respectively. The album charted at No. 35 in America.

Track listing
All songs written by Thomas Dolby, except where otherwise indicated.

Original LP
Side A
 "Dissidents" (Thomas Dolby, Kevin Armstrong, Matthew Seligman) – 4:56
 "The Flat Earth" – 6:41
 "Screen Kiss" – 5:33

Side B
 "White City" – 5:19
 "Mulu the Rain Forest" – 5:00
 "I Scare Myself" (Dan Hicks) – 5:40
 "Hyperactive!" – 4:13

2009 Collector's Edition CD bonus tracks
"Get Out of My Mix (Dolby's Cube)" – 4:44
 "Puppet Theatre" (Dolby, Seligman) – 4:14
 "Dissidents (The Search for Truth Part 1)" (Dolby, Armstrong, Seligman) – 7:17
 "Field Work (London Mix)" (With Ryuichi Sakamoto) (Dolby, Sakamoto) – 4:05
 "Don't Turn Away" (From the film Howard the Duck) (Dolby, Allee Willis) – 5:03
 "The Devil Is an Englishman" (From the film Gothic) (Dolby, Stephen Volk) – 3:30
 "I Scare Myself" (Live on tour, 1984) (Hicks) – 6:17
 "Marseille" (Live on tour, 1984) (Dolby, Adele Bertei) – 4:41

Bonus audio downloads from thomasdolby.com:
 "Audio Lecture/White City" – 8:11
 "Dissidents" (Live) (Dolby, Armstrong, Seligman) – 4:46
 "I Scare Myself" (Live) (Hicks) – 5:36
 "New Toy" (Live) – 4:22
 "Puppet Theatre" (Alternate Version) (Dolby, Seligman) – 4:19

Personnel

Musicians
Thomas Dolby – keyboards, piano, programming, sampling, effects, vocals
Matthew Seligman – bass guitar
Kevin Armstrong – guitar, backing vocals, trumpet, "The Analyst" 
Clif Brigden – percussion, computer drums
Adele Bertei – backing vocals (tracks 1, 2, 7)
Lesley Fairbairn – backing vocals (tracks 2, 3, 6, 14, 15)
Bruce Woolley – backing vocals (track 5)
Matthew Salt – tins, thunder sheet (track 7)
Peter Thoms – trombone (tracks 6, 7)
Justin Hildreth – drums (tracks 7, 14, 15)
Robyn Hitchcock – "Keith" (track 4)
Louise Ulfstedt – "The Analyst" (track 7)
Stevie Wonder – harmonica (track 12)
Chucho Merchán – guitar (tracks 14, 15)
Debra Barsha – keyboards, backing vocals (tracks 14, 15)
Lyndon Connah – keyboards, backing vocals (tracks 14, 15)

Technical
Dan Lacksman – engineer
Mike Shipley – mixing (tracks 1–6)
Alan Douglas – mixing (track 7)
Thomas Dolby – producer; mixing (tracks 8–15); album design
Ryuichi Sakamoto – producer (track 11)
Wally Traugott – mastering
Richard Haughton – photography
Assorted iMAGes – graphics, album design

References

Thomas Dolby albums
1984 albums
Albums produced by Thomas Dolby
EMI Records albums
Capitol Records albums